Mental health in education is the impact that mental health (including emotional, psychological, and social well-being) has on educational performance. Mental health often viewed as an adult issue, but in fact, almost half of adolescents in the United States are affected by mental disorders, and about 20% of these are categorized as “severe.” Mental health issues can pose a huge problem for students in terms of academic and social success in school. Education systems around the world treat this topic differently, both directly through official policies and indirectly through cultural views on mental health and well-being. These curriculums are in place to effectively identify mental health disorders and treat it using therapy, medication, or other tools of alleviation.

Prevalence of mental health issues in adolescents 
According to the National Institute of Mental Health, approximately 46% of American adolescents aged 13–18 will suffer from some form of mental disorder. About 21% will suffer from a disorder that is categorized as “severe,” meaning that the disorder impairs their daily functioning, but almost two-thirds of these adolescents will not receive formal mental health support. The most common types of disorders among adolescents as reported by the NIMH is anxiety disorders (including generalized anxiety disorder, phobias, post-traumatic stress disorder, obsessive-compulsive disorder, and others), with a lifetime prevalence of about 25% in youth aged 13–18 and 6% of those cases being categorized as severe. Next is mood disorders (major depressive disorder, dysthymic disorder, and/or bipolar disorder), with a lifetime prevalence of 14% and 4.7% for severe cases in adolescents. A similarly common disorder is Attention deficit hyperactivity disorder (ADHD), which is categorized as a childhood disorder but oftentimes carries through into adolescence and adulthood. The prevalence for ADHD in American adolescents is 9%, and 1.8% for severe cases.

An effect of this high prevalence is high suicide rates among adolescents. In 2021 study conducted by NIMH, mental health concerns were identified in a third (31.4%) of the suicide deaths examined, with the most common diagnoses being attention-deficit/hyperactivity disorder (ADHD) or depression. Suicide was the second leading cause of death among persons aged 10–29 years in the United States during 2011–2019. More teenagers and young adults die from suicide than cancer, heart disease, AIDS, birth defects, stroke, pneumonia, influenza, and chronic lung disease combined. There are an average of over 3,470 attempts by students in grades 9–12.

According to APA, the percentage of students going for college mental health counselling has been rising in recent years, which by report for anxiety as the most common factor, depression as the second, stress as the third, family issues as the fourth, and academic performance and relationship problems as the fifth and sixth most.

Common disorder's effects on academics and school life 
Mental disorders can affect classroom learning, such as poor attendance, difficulties with academic performance, poor social integration, trouble adjusting to school, problems with behavior regulation, and attention and concentration issues, all of which is critical to the success of the student. High school students who screen positive for psychosocial dysfunction report three times as many absent and tardy days as students who do not identify dysfunction. This leads to much higher dropout rates and lower overall academic achievement. In the United States, only 40 percent of students with emotional, behavioral and mental health disorders graduate from high school, compared to the national average of 76 percent. Some of these disorders may also cause students to prioritize their academics over their own health which will in turn, will only cause their health to decline even more (Beresin et al. 2017).

Anxiety 
Students with anxiety disorders are statistically less likely to attend college than those without, and those with social phobias are twice as likely to fail a grade or not finish high school as students who have never had the condition. Anxiety disorders are typically more difficult to recognize than disruptive behavior disorders such as ADHD because the symptoms are internalized. Anxiety may manifest as recurring fears and worries about routine parts of every day life, avoiding activities, school or social interactions and it can interfere with the ability to focus and learn.

Additionally, anxiety disorders can prevent students from seeking or forming social connections, which negatively affects students' sense of belonging and in turn impacts their school experience and academic performance. Students may suffer from social anxiety, preventing them from going out and creating new relationships with new people or any social reaction one might come across.

There is a specific character in which people with anxiety often experience. People with anxiety experience frequent worries and fears about everyday situations. Anxiety can also be identified as a sudden feeling of intense fear or terror that can reach a peak within minutes. These anxiety symptoms usually develops during childhood or teen years and may continue into adulthood. Some examples of symptoms include: feeling nervous, restless or tense, having a sense of impeding danger, panic, or doom, having an increased heart rate, breathing rapidly, sweating, trembling, feeling weak or tired, trouble concentrating or thinking about anything other than the present worry, having trouble sleeping, experiencing gastrointestinal problems, having difficulty controlling worry, or having the urge to avoid things that trigger anxiety. Also, there are several different types of anxiety disorders which are agoraphobia, anxiety disorder due to a medical condition, generalized anxiety disorder, panic disorder, selective mutisim, separation anxiety disorder, social anxiety disorder, specific phobias, substance-induced anxiety disorder, etc.

Depression 
Depression can cause students to have problems in class, from completing their work, to even attending class at all. In 2020, approximately 13% of youth aged 12 to 17 years old have had one major depressive episode (MDE) in the past year, with an overwhelming 70% left untreated. According to the National Center for Mental Health Checkups at Columbia University, "High depression scores have been associated with low academic achievement, high scholastic anxiety, increased school suspensions, and decreased ability or desire to complete homework, concentrate, and attend classes." Depression symptoms can make it challenging for students to keep up with course loads, or even find the energy to make it through the full school day.

Depression can be defined as medical illness that negatively affects how you feel, think, and act. The good side is that depression is treatable. Depression is when you get feelings of sadness or loss of interest in activities you once enjoyed. This can later lead onto having varieties of emotional and physical problems. Also, this can decrease the ability to function inside and outside. Some examples of depression symptoms are feeling sad, loss of interest, changes in appetite, trouble sleeping, loss of energy, increase in purposeless physical activity, feeling worthless, difficulty in thinking, concentrating, or making decisions, and thoughts of death or suicide. These symptoms must usually last two weeks and also represent a change in functioning in order for a diagnosis of depression.

Attention deficit hyperactivity disorder 
Attention disorders are the principal predictors of diminished academic achievement. Students with ADHD tend to have trouble mastering behaviors and practices demanded of them by the public education system in the United States, such as the ability to quietly sit still or to apply themselves to one focused task for extended durations. ADHD can mean that students have problems concentration, filtering out distracting external stimuli, and seeing large tasks through to completion. These students can also struggle with time management and organization.

ADHD stands for attention-deficit/hyperactivity disorder. This is considered as one of the most common mental disorders for children, however it affects many adults as well. Some examples of symptoms are not paying attention to details and making careless mistakes, having problems of staying focused on activities, not being able to be seen as listening, having problems in organizing, avoiding tasks, and forgetting daily tasks.

Other common struggles for adolescents

Alcoholism 
More than 90 percent of all alcoholic drinks consumed by young people are consumed through binge drinking, which can lead to Alcoholism. Alcoholism can affect ones’ mental health by being dependent on it, putting drinking before their own classwork.   People who consume alcohol before the age of fourteen are more likely to drink more often without thinking about the consequences later on. Students who drink alcohol can also experience consequences such as higher risk of suicide, memory problems, and misuse of other drugs. A 2017 survey found that 30% of high school students have drunk alcohol and 14% of high schoolers have binge drank.

Suicide 
According to the California Dept. of Public Health there were 2,210 suicides in 2019 in the US age range of 15-19 and a total of 6,500 suicides from ages 5–25. Some research estimates that among 15-24 year-olds, there are approximately 100-200 suicide attempts for every suicide. Adolescent suicidality may be a product of network positions characterized by either relative isolation or structural imbalance and a growing body of research links social isolation to suicide. Most suicides reported in Ohio from 1963 to 1965 revealed that they tended to be social outcasts (played no sports, had no hobbies, and were not part of any clubs). They also suggested that half of these students were failing or near-failing at the time of their deaths. These periods of failure and frustration lower the individual's self-concept to a point where they have little sense of self-worth. In fact, students who perceive their academic performance as "failing" are three times more likely to attempt suicide than those who perceive their performance to be acceptable. However, academic failure in school is not the only cause of suicide in schools. Bullying, social isolation, and issues at home are all reasons why students commit suicide.

Covid-19 and mental health

Early Covid-19 Predictions 
Outbreaks of disease forecast a rise in mental health policies. Increased levels of unemployment and emotional distress during the global COVID-19 pandemic led to and evidenced such as rise in 2020. There were cases of increased isolation and depression rates of the elderly, xenophobia against people of Asian descent, and resulting mental health effects of large-scale quarantine and business closures. Not only is an achievement gap projected for students that undergo the COVID-19 pandemic, but significant repercussions are expected for the mental health and well-being of students in low-income families, since more than half of students utilize reduced-priced or free mental health resources provided by schools. JAMA Pediatrics expects that the global health crisis will worsen pre-existing mental health disorders in students and the number of childhood mental health disorders will increase with the higher prevalence of social isolation and familial income decline due to economic recession.

The Kaiser Family Foundation reported that 56% of Americans have endured at least one negative mental health effect due to stress related to the outbreak. This can surface as increased alcohol and drug use, frequent headaches, trouble sleeping and eating, or short tempers. Additionally, in May 2020, Well Being Trust reported that the pandemic could lead to 75,000 additional "deaths of despair" from overusing drugs and alcohol or suicide from unemployment, social isolation, and general anxiety regarding the virus. Thus, although as of 2020 there are no federal requirements in place, a rise in mental health awareness and approval of policies is expected post-COVID-19.

Current Covid-19 Effects 
"The COVID-19 pandemic led to a worldwide lockdown and school closures, which have placed a substantial mental health burden on children and college students. Through a systematic search of the literature on PubMed and Collabovid of studies published January 2020–July 2021, findings of five studies on children and 16 studies on college students found that both groups reported feeling more anxious, depressed, fatigued, and distressed than prior to the pandemic. As a result of COVID-19, children, adolescent, and college students are experiencing long duration of quarantine, physical isolation from their friends, teachers, and extended family members, and are forced to adapt to a virtual way of learning. A two-year study during the pandemic on Greek University students revealed severe prevalence of stress, anxiety, and depression especially during the second year of the pandemic. Due to this unexpected and forced transition, children and college students may not have adequate academic resources, social contact and support, or a learning-home environment, which may lead to a heightened sense of loneliness, distress, anger, and boredom—causing an increase in negative psychological outcomes. Mental health issues may also arise from the disease itself, such as grief from loss of lives, opportunities, and employment."

Policies in public schools

United States 
Concerning U.S. state policies as of 2020, three states have approved mandatory mental health curriculums. In July 2018, New York and Virginia passed legislation that made mental health instruction mandatory in public education. New York has made it mandatory for students from Kindergarten to 12th grade to undergo mental health instruction. After experiencing traumatizing suicidal behavior with his own son, Virginia Senator Creigh Deeds thought it necessary to teach warning signs to 9th and 10th graders so they can look out for the safety of their peers and themselves. The board of education is in charge of deliberating details of the curriculum but the senator is hopeful that teachers will also receive training on warning signs. Even though investment in mental health has never been higher, the state legislature has yet to approve extra funding to implement the curriculum. In July 2019, Florida's board of education made 5 hours of mental health education mandatory for grades 6 through 12, making it the third state to approve such instruction.

Nationally, there has been some effort to increase education on mental health in the public school system. In 2020, the U.S. Department of Education awarded School-Based Mental Health Services grants to 6 state education agencies (SEAs) to increase the number of qualified (i.e., licensed, certified, well-trained, or credentialed) mental health service providers that provide school-based mental health services to students in local educational agencies (LEAs) with demonstrated need. There has been a growing popularity with school-based mental health services in United States public school systems, in which schools have their students covered for mental health care. This concept has the potential to allow students to have access to services that can help them understand and work through any stressors they may face within their schooling, as well as a better chance of intervention for those students who need it.

Canada 
In Canada, the Mental Health Strategy highlights the importance of mental health promotion, stigma reduction, and early recognition of mental health problems in schools to be a priority (Mental Health Commission, 2012). Implementing comprehensive school health and post-secondary mental health initiatives that promote mental health and prevention for those at risk was recommended by the Mental Health Commission of Canada. A major focus of school programming is to promote positive mental health to all students instead of only for those already identified as having a mental health problem. This is a preventative measure as it seeks to promote well-being and emotional regulation in all students to avoid mental health problems from further occurring or escalating.

Bhutan 
In Bhutan, efforts toward developing education began in 1961 thanks to Ugyen Wangchuck and the introduction of the First Development Plan, which provided free primary education. By 1998, 400 schools were established. Students' tuition, books, supplies, equipment, and food were all free for boarding schools in the 1980s, and some schools also provided their students with clothing. The assistance of the United Nations Food and Agriculture Organizations' World Food Programme allowed free midday meals in some primary schools. This governmental assistance is important to note in the country's Gross National Happiness (GNH), which is at the forefront of developmental policies and is the responsibility of the government. Article 9 of the Constitution of Bhutan states that "the state shall strive to promote those conditions that will enable the pursuit of Gross National Happiness."

Gross national happiness 
GNH in Bhutan is based on four principles: sustainable and equitable economic development, conservation of the environment, preservation and promotion of culture, and good governance. Their constitution prescribes that the state will provide free access to public health services through a three-tiered health system which provides preventative, promotive, and curative services. Because of this policy, Bhutan was able to eliminate iodine deficiency disorder in 2003, leprosy in 1997, and achieved childhood immunization for all children in 1991. It became the first country to ban tobacco in 2004, and cases of malaria decreased from 12,591 cases in 1999 to 972 cases in 2009. The elimination of these diseases and the strong push for GNH allows for all people (including adolescents who are provided with many necessary items and free education) to live happier lives than they otherwise may have had.

United Kingdom 
The Department for Education in United Kingdom is working on developing an organizational approach to support mental health and character education. An October 2017 joint report from the Departments for Education and Health outlines this approach with regard to staff training, raising awareness of mental health challenges that children face, and involvement of parents and families in students' mental health.

Singapore 
REACH is a program in Singapore that looks to provide interventions for students struggling with mental illness. A quote from the REACH website reads, "The majority of children and adolescents do not suffer from mental illness. However, when a student has been identified, the school counselor, with consultation from the school’s case management team, will look into managing the care of the student. When necessary, guidance specialists and educational psychologists from the Ministry of Education will render additional support.

In 2010, the Voluntary Welfare Organizations (VWOs), in collaboration with the National Council of Social Service (NCSS), have also been invited to join this network to provide community and clinical support to at-risk children. Students and children with severe emotional and behavioral problems may need more help. The REACH team collaborates with school counselors/VWOs to provide suitable school-based interventions to help these students. Such school/VWO based interventions often provide the requisite, timely help that these students and children need. Further specialized assessment or treatment may be necessary for more severe cases. The student or child may be referred to the Child Guidance Clinic after assessment by the REACH team for further psychiatric evaluation and intervention. These interventions may include medications, psychotherapy, group or family work and further assessments."

Mexico 
Traditionally, mental health was not considered a part of public health in Mexico because of other health priorities, lack of knowledge about the true magnitude of mental health problems, and a complex approach involving the intervention of other sectors in addition to the public health sector. Among the key documents anticipating the policy change was a report presented by the Mexican Health Foundation in 1995, which opened a very constructive debate. It introduced basic tenets for health improvement, elements for an analysis of the health situation related to the burden of disease approach, and a strategic proposal with concurrent recommendations for reforming the system. Mexico has an extensive legal frame of reference dealing with health and mental health. The objectives are to promote a healthy psychosocial development of different population groups, and reduce the effects of behavioral and psychiatric disorders. This should be achieved through graded and complementary interventions, according to the
level of care, and with the coordinated participation of the public, social, and private sectors in municipal, state, and national settings. The strategic lines consider training and qualification of human resources, growth, rehabilitation, and regionalization of
mental health service networks, formulation of guidelines and evaluation. All age groups as well as specific sub-populations (indigenous groups, women, street children, populations in disaster areas), and other state and regional priorities are considered.

Japan and China 
In Japan and China, the approach to mental health is focused on the collective of students, much like the national aims of these Asian countries. Much like in the US, there is much research done in the realm of student mental health, but not many national policies in place to prevent and aid mental health problems students face. Japanese students face considerable academic pressure as imposed by society and school systems. In 2006, Japanese police gathered notes left from students who had committed suicide that year and noted overarching school pressures as the primary source of their problems. Additionally, the dynamic of collective thinking—the centripetal force of Japan's society, wherein individual identity is sacrificed for the functioning benefit of a greater collective—results in the stigmatization of uniqueness. As child psychiatrist Dr. Ken Takaoka explained to CNN, schools prioritize this collectivism, and “children who do not get along in a group will suffer.”

South Korea 

South Korea has traditionally placed much value on education. As a nation that has a degree of enthusiasm like no other for education has created an environment where children are pressured to study more than ever. When mental health issues affect students there are very few resources available to help students cope. The nation's general view of mental health problems, such as anxiety, depression or thoughts of suicide, is that they are believed to be a sign of personal weakness that could bring shame upon a family if a member would be discovered to have such an illness. This is true if the problem arises in a social, educational or family setting. Rather than perceiving mental health issues as a medical condition and concern requiring treatment especially in students, a majority of Korea's population has perceived them as a cultural stigma. A study conducted by Yuri Yang, a professor at the University of Florida and a member of the Department of Aging and Mental Health, found when surveying over 600 Korean citizens from the age of 20-60+ years in 2008, most of the older people, many of whom are parents, shared similar and negative views on mental health issues such as depression. The older adults generally were also found to have a negative view of mental health services, including those offered through the educational system, as they are deeply influenced by the cultural stigma around the topic. This negative view of mental health services in education has provided implications for students who are struggling emotionally, as many do not know what, if any, help might be available in the facilities of education. However, this does not mean no mental health services exist in the world or in the educational setting. The World Health Organization (WHO) in 2006 collected data  regarding Korea's mental health system. The goal of collecting this information was to attempt to improve the mental health system and to provide a baseline for monitoring the change. Despite Korea having a low budget for mental health services compared to other developed countries, it has taken steps to create long term mental health plans to advance its national health system such as raising more awareness for mental health, creating communities for students, and removing the cultural stigma around mental health.

Alleviation and fostering adjustment

Prevention 
Some schools may need to recognize that they are not just an institution, but are intended to help shape the lives of students and allow them to participate meaningfully in a social aspect of this environment. Psychologically, this can overshadow the academic aspect, yet often little heed is given. Athletics, faculty-student relationships, clubs, and other social activities are important so that no student is left in a "social limbo year after year." The pressures of school, extracurricular activities, work and relationships with friends and family can be a lot for an individual to manage and at times can be overwhelming. In order to prevent these overwhelming feelings from turning into a mental health problem, taking measures to prevent these emotions from escalating is essential. School-based programs that help students with emotional-regulation, stress management, conflict resolution, and active coping and cognitive restructuring are a few suggested ways that give students resources that can promote their mental health (Mental Health Commission, 2012).  Educators need to pay as much attention to the well-being of their students as they do on the academic aspect to ensure they are setting their students up for success in the future.

If teachers are aware of a student who is struggling with their mental health, they can assist in helping that individual receive the necessary help. According to the research Students who receive social-emotional and mental health will have a higher chance of more academic achievements. Since most children spend a large portion of the day at school, about 6 hours, schools are the ideal place for students to receive the services they need. When mental health is not addressed, this can cause issues with causing distractions to fellow students and teachers. This takes away from the opportunity for all students to get a complete opportunity to get the education they deserve.

According to a 2019 article regarding school social workers, the field of social workers in schools is continuing to grow. In 1996, there were only about 9,000 social workers in schools. This had increased to be between 20,000 and 22,000 social workers. According to the United States Department of Labor, Bureau of Labor Statistics, it is estimated the field will continue to grow from 2016 to 2026 due to the increase of mental health services that are being demanded in schools.

Belonging 
Belonging in the school environment may be the most important and relevant factors affecting students' performance in an academic setting. School-related stress and an increase in academic expectations may increase school-related stress and in turn negatively affect their academic performance. The absence of social acceptance has been shown to lead lowered interest and engagement because students have difficulty sustaining engagement in environments where they do not feel valued and welcome. The feeling of belonging creates a buffer between students and depressive symptoms and lessens the feelings of anxiety in school. Other components of not belonging can also affect students' feeling of belonging, which include not being represented racially, ethnically minority, or lack of first-generation representation in schools.

An issue that is faced in our society today is bullying which can happen at school or even in class. Bullying can cause issues for students such as chemical dependency, physical harm, and a decrease in performance academically. According to the NASP, a large percentage, about 70%-80%, of people have experienced bullying in their school years in which the student could have been the bully, victim, or even the bystander. In order for staff at schools to understand how to notice this as an issue and what to do to resolve it, NASP advocates for guiding principals in how to resolve these issues as well as providing information on available programs.

See also 
 College health
 Effects of stress on memory
 Learning disability
 Teacher burnout
 Mental Health
 Mental health day
 Mental health during the COVID-19 pandemic
 Mental health first aid
 Self-help groups for mental health
 Social determinants of mental health
 World Mental Health Day
 Mental health of Asian Americans
 Mental health in the workplace

References 

School counseling
 
Disability
Social constructionism
Positive psychology